The 2011–12 season of the Primera División de Fútbol Sala was the 23rd season of top-tier futsal in Spain. It is the first under "Primera División" name. The regular season started on September 9, 2011 and finished on May 11, 2012. The championship playoffs began on May 19 with quarter-finals series and ended with the final series from  12 to 24 June.

Barcelona Alusport won their 2nd title in a row by defeating ElPozo Murcia 3–2 in the Championship Final.

Teams

Personnel and kits

Stadia and locations

League table

Benicarló withdrew at mid-season. Later, the club was disbanded. All its records achieved were expunged. 
Source: Liga Nacional de Futbol Sala
Source:

Championship playoffs

Quarter-finals

First leg

Second leg

Third leg

Semi-finals

First leg

Second leg

Third leg

Final

First leg

Second leg

Third leg

Fourth leg

Fifth & final leg

Relegation playoff

 Marfil Santa Coloma remained in División de Honor.

Top scorers

See also
2011–12 Segunda División de Futsal
2011–12 Copa del Rey de Futsal
Futsal in Spain

References

External links
2011–12 season at lnfs.es

2011 12
1
Futsal
Spain